Paul Gégauff (10 August 1922 – 24 December 1983) was a French screenwriter, actor, and director. He collaborated with director Claude Chabrol on 14 films. Among his films are Les Biches, Plein Soleil and the autobiographical Une Partie de Plaisir.  In 1962, he and René Clement received an Edgar Award from the Mystery Writers of America as the screenwriters for Plein Soleil, which was named Best Foreign Language Film.

His first marriage to film producer and actress Danièle Gégauff ended in divorce. They had a daughter actress and singer, Clémence Gégauff. Paul Gégauff died after being stabbed by his second wife, Coco Ducados, on Christmas Eve 1983.

Chabrol once said of Gégauff: "When I want cruelty, I go off and look for Gégauff. Paul is very good at gingering things up...He can make a character look absolutely ridiculous and hateful in two seconds flat."

Filmography
 Journal d'un scélérat (1950)
 Le Signe du lion (1959)
 Les Cousins (1959)
 À double tour (1959) (writer)
 Plein soleil (1960)
 Les Bonnes Femmes (1960)
 Les Godelureaux (1961)
 L'oeil du malin (1962)
 Ophélia (1963)
 Les grands chemins (1963)
 Le gros coup (1964)
 Les plus belles escroqueries du monde (1964)
 L'autre femme (1964)
 Le Reflux (1965) (also directed)
 Le Scandale (1967)
 Diaboliquement vôtre (1967)
 Les Biches (1968)
 Delphine (1969)
 La femme écarlate (1969)
 More (1969)
 Que la bête meure (1969)
 Qui? (1970)
 Les Novices (1970)
 Ten Days' Wonder (1971)
 La Vallée (1972)
 Dr. Popaul (1972)
 La Rivale (1974)
 Une partie de plaisir (1975)
 Les Magiciens (1976)
 Brigade mondaine: La secte de Marrakech (1979)
 Historien om en moder (1979)
 Pigen fra havet (1980)
 Neon (1981)
 Le système du docteur Goudron et du professeur Plume (1981)
 Les folies d'Élodie (1981)
 Frankenstein 90 (1984)
 Ave Maria (1984)
 Oriana (1985)

References

External links 
 
 Paul Gégauff (1922-1983) Le perdant magnifique de la Nouvelle vague

1922 births
1983 deaths
People from Haut-Rhin
French male screenwriters
20th-century French screenwriters
Edgar Award winners
French people murdered abroad
People murdered in Norway
Deaths by stabbing in Norway
Male murder victims
20th-century French male writers